Emerging Crowd is a UK-based investment crowdfunding platform offering users equity and debt investments in unlisted emerging and frontier market companies. The platform enables growth-stage businesses to raise up to £4 million (equivalent to the regulatory maximum of €5 million) in a 12-month period. Emerging Crowd provides registered investors with the opportunity to invest in companies which were previously only accessible to private equity and venture capital funds or wealthy investors.

Emerging Crowd is regulated by the FCA as an appointed representative of Resolution Compliance Limited. The company was founded in June 2014 by Lucien Moolenaar and Will Tindall and launched in April 2015. It is based at Adam House on The Strand in London.

Model

Emerging Crowd uses the 'investment crowdfunding' model, an alternative form of financing for businesses seeking to raise capital. A 'crowd' of investors each invest or lend (according to the deal terms) a small amount of money (minimum £500) to a company which adds to the total funding amount required. Companies can, therefore, raise money without the need for banks or large investors, such as Private Equity or Venture Capital. Businesses can also benefit from the feedback and advice of a multitude of investors, potentially leading to better product development. By raising money for emerging and frontier market businesses, Emerging Crowd also provides a conduit between those businesses and UK based investors.

If a company successfully raises its target amount on the platform, Emerging Crowd takes a percentage of the amount raised as a success fee. No fee is taken if the target amount is not reached. The platform does have the facility for ‘overfunding’ whereby the company raising the money can elect to raise more than the target amount if that amount is reached first.

Shareholding Structure

Emerging Crowd operates a nominee structure for equity investments. The nominee, which is FCA regulated, holds legal title of the target company's shares for the benefit of individual investors. As the beneficial owners of the shares, the investors are entitled to all economic rights, as well as any voting rights and tax benefits (including SEIS and EIS, if applicable). The nominee structure ensures that all investors, no matter how much they have invested, are treated equally and that they are entitled to the same rights.

References

Defunct crowdfunding platforms of the United Kingdom
Internet properties established in 2015
2015 establishments in the United Kingdom